The UTVA Aero 3 was a piston-engined military trainer aircraft built in Yugoslavia to replace the Ikarus Aero 2 then in service. One hundred ten were built, in Yugoslav Air Force service from 1958 to mid-1970s. It was superseded by the UTVA 75.

Design and development
First flown in 1956 the Aero 3 was designed to meet a Yugoslav Air Force requirement for a primary trainer that could also be used in the army co-operation role.

The Aero 3 was a low wing cantilever monoplane that seated the student and instructor in tandem under a bubble canopy. Of all wood construction it had a fixed, tailwheel landing gear and powered by a nose-mounted 190 hp (142 kW) Lycoming O-435-A piston engine.

Former military operators
 
 Yugoslav Air Force
Aviation Technical Group of Aviation Training School (1958–1960)
Light Combat Aviation Squadron of 3rd Air Command (1959-1961)
Light Combat Aviation Squadron of 5th Air Command (1959-1961)
Light Combat Aviation Squadron of 7th Air Command (1959-1961)
463rd Light Combat Aviation Squadron (1961-1965)
464th Light Combat Aviation Squadron (1961-1965)
465th Light Combat Aviation Squadron (1961-1965)
Letalski center Maribor (Civil operator 1961-2011)

Aircraft on display
Serbia
 Museum of Aviation (Belgrade) in Belgrade
A UTVA Aero 3 prototype and UTVa Aero 3 are on display

Specifications

See also

References

Notes

Bibliography

External links

Photos and drawings at Ugolok Neba

Aero 3
1950s Yugoslav military trainer aircraft
Low-wing aircraft
Single-engined tractor aircraft
Aircraft first flown in 1956